Leprechaun is an arcade game manufactured by Enter-Tech in 1982.  It was licensed from Tong Electronic Inc. It was also manufactured as Pot of Gold by Game Plan. Leprechaun was designed for children, with a low difficulty and a smaller cabinet. By contrast, Pot of Gold used a normal-sized cabinet.

Gameplay
The player controls a sleuth running through a forest, trying to get a Leprechaun's pot of gold.  The pot of gold is randomly placed on the screen. When the pot of gold is touched, the player is taken to the next level. The Leprechaun chases the sleuth through the forest, trying to catch him. If he is caught the player loses a life and starts over from the beginning of the level. After all lives are lost, the game ends. Should the Leprechaun reach the pot of gold first, it is then relocated to another place on the screen. By touching the trees, the player's score increases, as does the value of the pot of gold. Every time the Leprechaun touches a tree, the pot's value decreases though the player's score remains the same. After each level and after every 30 seconds the Leprechaun's speed increases.

References

1982 video games
Arcade video games
Video games developed in the United States